James or Jim Boyd may refer to:

Academia
 James Boyd (schoolmaster) (1795–1856), Scottish schoolmaster and author
 James E. Boyd (scientist) (1906–1998), American scientist and academician; director of the Georgia Tech Research Institute
 James Dixon Boyd (1907–1968), Irish-American professor of anatomy
 James I. C. Boyd (1921–2009), British author and narrow gauge railway historian
 James Boyd (engineer), American mining engineer and educator

Arts and entertainment
 James Boyd (novelist) (1888–1944), American novelist
 Jim Boyd (actor) (1933–2013), American actor who appeared in The Electric Company
 Jimmy Boyd (1939–2009), American singer
 Jim Boyd (newscaster) (born 1942), American news anchor and reporter
 Jim Boyd (musician) (1956–2016), American musician from the Colville Indian Reservation

Politics and law
 James H. Boyd (mayor) (1809–1877), American politician, mayor of Jackson, Mississippi
 James P. Boyd (1826–1890), Canadian businessman and political figure
 James E. Boyd (politician) (1834–1906), American politician, governor of Nebraska
 James Edmund Boyd (1845–1935), U.S. federal judge
 James Boyd (Australian politician) (1867–1941), member of the Australian House of Representatives
 James H. Boyd (Atlantic City politician) (1906–1974), Atlantic City politician and crime and political boss
 Jimmy Boyd (Louisiana politician) (fl. 1944–1952), member of the Louisiana House of Representatives
 Jim Boyd (politician) (born 1956), American politician in the Florida Senate

Sports
 James Boyd (sportsman) (1891–1930), Scottish cricketer, rugby union international and Royal Navy officer
 Jimmy Boyd (footballer) (1907–1991), Scottish footballer
 Jimmy Boyd (baseball) (1918–1965), American Negro league baseball player
 Jim Boyd (boxer) (1930–1997), American boxer
 Jim Boyd (ice hockey) (born 1949), Canadian ice hockey player
 Jim Boyd (racing driver), New Zealand racing driver in the 1967 Tasman Series
 James Boyd (American football) (born 1977), American football player

Others
 James Boyd, 2nd Lord Boyd (c. 1469–1484), Scottish peer
 James Boyd, 9th Lord Boyd (died 1654), Scottish noble
 James William Boyd (1822–?), American military officer; supposed double of John Wilkes Booth
 James Harbottle Boyd (1858–1915), Hawaiian colonel
 James Matthew Boyd (1975–2014), American man fatally shot by police in James Boyd shooting

Other uses
 James H. Boyd Intermediate School, primary school in Huntington, New York